is a Japanese manga series written and illustrated by Gege Akutami. It has been serialized in Shueisha's shōnen manga magazine Weekly Shōnen Jump since March 2018, with its chapters collected and published in 22 tankōbon volumes . The story follows high school student Yuji Itadori as he joins a secret organization of Jujutsu Sorcerers to eliminate a powerful Curse named Ryomen Sukuna, of whom Yuji becomes the host. Jujutsu Kaisen is a sequel to Akutami's Tokyo Metropolitan Curse Technical School, serialized in Shueisha's Jump GIGA from April to July 2017, later collected in a tankōbon volume, retroactively titled as Jujutsu Kaisen 0, in December 2018.

Jujutsu Kaisen is licensed for English-language release in North America by Viz Media, which has published the manga in print since December 2019. Shueisha publishes the series in English on the Manga Plus online platform. Two novels, written by Ballad Kitaguni, were published in May 2019 and January 2020, respectively. A 24-episode anime television series adaptation produced by MAPPA, aired on MBS from October 2020 to March 2021; a second season is set to premiere in July 2023. The anime is licensed by Crunchyroll for streaming outside of Asia, which premiered an English dub in November 2020. The anime's original soundtrack was released in April 2021.

By August 2022, the Jujutsu Kaisen manga had over 70 million copies in circulation, including related novels, digital versions and Jujutsu Kaisen 0, making it one of the best-selling manga series of all time.

Synopsis

Setting
In Jujutsu Kaisen, all living beings emanate energy called , which arises from negative emotions that naturally flow throughout the body. Ordinary people cannot control this flow in their bodies. These curses are shown as gruesome monsters, ghosts, and yōkai.

 are people who control the flow of Cursed Energy in their bodies, allowing them to use it as they please and also to reduce its release. High-ranking Sorcerers and Curses can refine this energy and use it to perform , which tend to be unique to the user or their family. Inside the domain, all of their attacks will always connect and grow in strength.

Plot

Yuji Itadori is an unnaturally fit high school student living in Sendai. On his deathbed, his grandfather instils two powerful messages within Yuji: "always help others" and "die surrounded by people." Yuji's friends at the Occult Club attracted Curses to their school when they unsealed a rotten finger talisman which Yuji swallowed to protect Megumi Fushiguro and his friends, becoming host to a powerful Curse named Ryomen Sukuna. Due to Sukuna's evil nature, all sorcerers are required to exorcise him (and, by extension, Yuji) immediately. But upon seeing Yuji retaining control over his body, Megumi's teacher Satoru Gojo brings him to the Tokyo Prefectural Jujutsu High School with a proposal to his superiors: postpone Yuji's death sentence and train under Gojo until he consumes all of Sukuna's fingers so the Curse can be eliminated. At the same time, a group of cursed spirits plot a multi-layered attack on the world of jujutsu sorcery, including the Cursed Spirit Mahito and a corrupted sorcerer named Suguru Geto, who was executed by Gojo a year prior. The Kyoto school's principal wants Yuji dead immediately at the exchange event between the Tokyo and Kyoto jujutsu schools. In contrast, others, including fellow student Nobara Kugisaki, side with Gojo to keep Yuji alive.

After several missions, the disfigured Kyoto Jujutsu Tech second-year student Kokichi Muta, who controls the Cursed Corpse Mechamaru, is revealed to be a mole. After Muta swiftly betrays them, Mahito kills him. Geto and the cursed spirits lay a screen over Shibuya, and various sorcerers arrive at the scene to fight them. Gojo fights off cursed spirits and exorcises Hanami, a high-ranking cursed spirit, but is sealed away by Geto in a special artifact, while Nobara is killed by Mahito, who is absorbed by Geto. The events also reveal that the current Geto is not the original but rather Geto's corpse possessed by an ancient sorcerer named Kenjaku. Yuji and his allies face Kenjaku's forces, with Gojo still trapped inside the artifact, but in the resulting battle, Sukuna takes over Yuji's body and destroys Shibuya. As the incident ends, Kenjaku reveals that he has been jumping from body to body for thousands of years and implanting Binding Vows, which in turn awakens thousands of new sorcerers throughout Japan, including Tsumiki Fushiguro, Megumi's step-sister. He then unleashes a slew of curses on Japan, ushering in chaos and a world of cursed spirits reminiscent of the Heian period.

In the aftermath, Yuji and Megumi team up with second-year student Yuta Okkotsu and Yuki Tsukumo, a special grade jujutsu sorcerer and one of the most powerful sorcerers of all time, along with half-human, half-Curse Choso and second-year student Maki Zen'in to meet with Master Tengen, an immortal, part-Curse part-human jujutsu sorcerer. Tengen reveals Kenjaku's plan to merge the former's consciousness with Japan's human population. The Culling Game, Kenjaku's all-out war between the sorcerers and Curse users of Japan, then begins. Maki goes to the Zen'in compound to collect cursed tools she needs, but is forced to kill her entire clan when they lay a trap for her. Meanwhile, Yuji, Yuta, and Megumi seek out a mysterious person named "Angel" who can free Gojo from the artifact.

Production
In 2017, Gege Akutami published Tokyo Metropolitan Curse Technical School, a 4-chapter series that ran in Jump GIGA from April 28 to July 28. This series would serve later as a prequel to Jujutsu Kaisen, being retroactively titled as Jujutsu Kaisen 0. According to Hiroyuki Nakano, the chief editor of Weekly Shōnen Jump, Jujutsu Kaisen received unanimous approval in the serialization committee. It debuted in Weekly Shōnen Jump on March 5, 2018. 

Akutami stated that Neon Genesis Evangelion influenced the mythological aspects of the series, being also influenced by horror and found footage films. Akutami is particularly a fan of Yoshihiro Togashi, author of YuYu Hakusho and Hunter × Hunter, expressing intentions to have an art style as close as possible to his. The author is also a fan of Tite Kubo, author of Bleach, and discussed in an interview with him the similarities between their works. Other manga artists who influenced Akutami include Masashi Kishimoto (Naruto) and Yusuke Murata (Eyeshield 21 and One-Punch Man illustrator). The magic system of Jujutsu Kaisen is largely based on Hunter × Hunter, whose fights, in Akutami's words, "rejects emotional arguments", stating, however, that like Daisuke Ashihara, World Triggers author, whose magic system is also similar to Togashi's series, Akutami is trying to find and develop their own style. In particular, Akutami believes the first chapter was a mix of Bleach and Naruto. Akutami regrets some elements of the first chapter, due to the short appearance of Yuji's grandfather within the story.

In October 2020, Akutami stated that the story's ending and main stages are planned, but that the path between the two remains "fairly free." In February 2021, Akutami stated that the series would probably be finished within two years, declaring, however, no confidence in that statement. Akutami knows how the story for Megumi Fushiguro will end, but not for Sukuna. On June 9, 2021, it was announced that the manga would enter on hiatus due to the author's health issues; it resumed publication on August 2 of the same year. In December 2022, Akutami hinted that the manga would end within a year, stating during the Jump Festa '23 event: "If you accompany me for up to one more year (probably), I will be very happy."

Publication

Jujutsu Kaisen is written and illustrated by Gege Akutami. The series started in Shueisha's Weekly Shōnen Jump magazine on March 5, 2018. Its chapters are collected and published by Shueisha into individual tankōbon volumes. The first volume was published on July 4, 2018. As of March 3, 2023, twenty-two volumes have been released.

Shueisha began to simulpublish the series in English on the app and website Manga Plus in January 2019. Viz Media published the first three chapters for its "Jump Start" initiative. In March 2019, Viz Media announced the print release of the series in North America. The first volume was published on December 3, 2019. As of December 20, 2022, eighteen volumes have been released.

Related media

Novels
Two novels written by Ballad Kitaguni have been released under the Jump J-Books imprint. The first, was released on May 1, 2019. The second novel, was released on January 4, 2020. In February 2022, Viz Media announced they licensed the novels for English publication. Jujutsu Kaisen: Summer of Ashes, Autumn of Dust was released on December 27, 2022. Jujutsu Kaisen: Thorny Road at Dawn is set to be released on April 25, 2023.

Anime

An anime television series adaptation was announced by Weekly Shōnen Jump in November 2019. The manga author, Gege Akutami, and the main cast members appeared at Jump Festa '20 on December 22, 2019. The series was produced by MAPPA and directed by Sunghoo Park. Hiroshi Seko was in charge of the scripts, Tadashi Hiramatsu designed the characters. While the anime had an advanced streaming debut on YouTube and Twitter on September 19, 2020, it officially aired on MBS and TBS's Super Animeism block from October 3, 2020, to March 27, 2021. The series ran for 24 episodes. From episode 3 onwards, the series includes post-credits anime shorts titled , which focus on the daily lives of the characters.

On February 12, 2022, a second season was announced. It is set to premiere in July 2023. It will air for two cours (quarters of a year) for a continuous half-year run and will adapt the "Kaigyoku/Gyokusetsu" and "Shibuya Incident" arcs.

The anime is licensed by Crunchyroll for streaming outside of Asia. Crunchyroll has released streaming dubs for the series in English, Spanish, Portuguese, French and German that premiered on November 20, 2020, with the English dub also premiering on HBO Max on December 4, 2020. Viz Media released the first part of the first season on home video on February 28, 2023. In Southeast Asia and South Asia, Medialink licensed the series and streamed it on iQIYI. The company also released the series on Netflix in Southeast Asia, India, Hong Kong, and Taiwan on June 3, 2021.

Music
The original soundtrack of the Jujutsu Kaisen anime series is composed by Hiroaki Tsutsumi, Yoshimasa Terui and Alisa Okehazama. The series' first opening theme is ", performed by Eve, while the first ending theme is "Lost in Paradise feat. AKLO" performed by ALI. The second opening theme is "Vivid Vice", performed by Who-ya Extended, while the second ending theme is "", performed by Cö Shu Nie. The original soundtrack was released on a 2-CD set on April 21, 2021. Anime Limited released the soundtrack digitally in North America, Europe and Oceania on April 21, 2021, and was released on CD and vinyl on January 31, 2022.

Video games
In June 2021, a free-to-play RPG, titled Jujutsu Kaisen: Phantom Parade, developed by Sumzap for smartphones was announced. The game was set to be released in 2022; however, it has been delayed to sometime within 2023.

A collaboration with PlayerUnknown's Battlegrounds (PUBG Mobile) was announced in August 2021. The collaboration was made available globally, except in Japan and Mainland China, from February 15 to March 15, 2022.

Stage play
A stage play adaptation of the manga was announced at the Jump Festa '22 event in December 2021. It ran at The Galaxy Theatre in Tokyo's Tennōzu from July 15–31, and at the Mielparque Hall Osaka from August 4–14, 2022. The play is directed by Kensaku Kobayashi and written by Kōhei Kiyasu. The cast includes Ryūji Satō as Yuji Itadori, Kazuaki Yasue as Megumi Fushiguro, Erika Toyohara as Nobara Kugisaki, Sara Takatsuki as Maki Zen'in, Fūma Sadamoto as Toge Inumaki, and Takeshi Terayama as Panda.

Other media
A fanbook, titled , which features exclusive information about the series, character profiles, author commentaries, an interview and a special dialogue between Akutami and Bleach author Tite Kubo, was published by Shueisha on March 4, 2021.

From September 16, 2022, to July 2, 2023, Universal Studios Japan hosted attractions based on Jujutsu Kaisen. "Jujutsu Kaisen the Real 4-D" attraction will feature a 4D cinema experience (with all the usual wind in your face, sprays of water, and moving seats) for an entirely original animation in about 20 minutes long. Other attraction is a roller coaster called "Jujutsu Kaisen × Hollywood Dream - The Ride ~Kaikai Kitan~" which ran until January 18, 2023. It features an inbuilt sound system that allows each individual rider to pick from selection of songs to ride to.

In October 2022, Crunchyroll and BoxLunch announced their merchandise collaboration for the series' photo experience spots alongside My Hero Academia, in select stores in the United States. Fans can take the pictures through select locations, featuring an additional installation with characters of the series. The BoxLunch stores are also hosted a lottery with an exclusive meet-and-greet event with the Jujutsu Kaisen voice actors as the prize.

Reception

Manga
Jujutsu Kaisen was 6th on the 5th Next Manga Awards in the Print category in 2018. The series ranked 1st on the "Nationwide Bookstore Employees' Recommended Comics" by the Honya Club website in 2019. It won the 3rd annual Tsutaya Comic Award in 2019. In 2019, the manga was nominated for the 65th Shogakukan Manga Award in the shōnen category. The series ranked 31st on the 2020 "Book of the Year" list by Da Vinci magazine; it ranked 4th on the 2021 list; and 6th on the 2022 list. On TV Asahi's Manga Sōsenkyo 2021 poll, in which 150.000 people voted for their top 100 manga series, Jujutsu Kaisen ranked 19th. Jujutsu Kaisen won the Mandō Kobayashi Manga Grand Prix 2020, created by comedian and manga enthusiast Kendo Kobayashi, in which each year's winner is decided based on his personal taste. The manga was nominated for the 25th annual Tezuka Osamu Cultural Prize in 2021. On a 2021 survey conducted by LINE Research asking Japanese high school students what manga series they are currently into, Jujutsu Kaisen topped the rankings for both girls and boys. The series was #19 on the annual Twitter Japan's Trend Awards in 2021, based on the social network's top trending topics of the year.

Sales
The Jujutsu Kaisen manga had 600,000 copies in circulation by December 2018, 770,000 copies in circulation by February 1, 2019, 1.1 million copies in circulation by February 2019, 2 million copies in circulation by June 2019, 2.5 million copies in circulation by November 2019, 4.5 million copies in circulation by May 2020, 6.8 million copies in circulation by September 2020, and over 10 million copies in circulation by October 2020, having grown 400% in one year, and about 230% in a half year. By December 2020, the series had 15 million copies in circulation. By January 13, 2021, the series had over 20 million copies in circulation, and increased to 25 million copies in circulation by January 26. By February 2021, the manga had over 30 million copies in circulation. By the start of March 2021, the series had over 36 million copies in circulation, and by the end of the month, the manga recorded over 40 million copies in circulation. By April 2021, the manga had over 45 million copies in circulation. By May 2021, the manga had over 50 million copies in circulation. By October 2021, the manga had over 55 million copies in circulation. By December 2021, the manga had over 60 million copies in circulation. By April 2022, the manga had over 65 million copies in circulation. By August 2022, the manga had over 70 million copies in circulation.

Jujutsu Kaisen was the 5th best-selling manga series in 2020 (from the period between November 2019 to November 2020), with 6,702,736 copies sold. In January 2021, Jujutsu Kaisens first fifteen volumes at the time (including volume 0) took 15 of top 16 spots of Oricon's weekly manga ranking (week of January 11–17), being only surpassed by Attack on Titans 33rd volume, which topped the list. Jujutsu Kaisen was the second best-selling manga series in the first half of 2021 (period between November 2020 and May 2021), behind Demon Slayer: Kimetsu no Yaiba, with over 23 million copies sold, while its 16 volumes at the time (including volume 0), were among the 25 best-selling manga volumes. It was the best-selling manga series in 2021, with over 30 million copies sold; its eighteen volumes at the time (including volume 0) were among the top 25 best-selling volumes. It was the best-selling manga series for second consecutive year in 2022, with over 12.2 million copies sold; volume 18 was the best-selling manga volume of the year, while volumes 17, 19 and 20 were among the 30 best-selling manga volumes of the year.

In North America, the volumes of Jujutsu Kaisen were ranked on NPD BookScan's monthly top 20 adult graphic novels list since January 2021. They were also ranked on The New York Times Graphic Books and Manga bestseller monthly list since February 2021. According to ICv2, Jujutsu Kaisen was the 7th best-selling manga franchise for fall 2021 (September–December) in the United States, and it was also the 6th "most efficient manga franchise" for retailer bookshelves, based on the website's calculations of which manga franchises had the highest sales per volume.

Critical reception
Leroy Douresseaux of Comic Book Bin gave the first volume a score of 8.5/10. Douresseaux praised the series for its characters, plots, settings, and internal mythology, and described it as a "combination battle manga and horror comic book". Shawn Hacaga of The Fandom Post, in his review of the first volume, compared the series to early Bleach and praised it for its world, lore, characters and artwork, concluding that it is a "solid first volume". Hannah Collins of CBR found parallels between Yuji and Sukuna and Marvel Comics characters Eddie Brock and Venom. She also noted similarities to Bleach, Blue Exorcist and Tokyo Ghoul. Collins commended the manga and, regarding its then recently announced anime adaptation, concluded that Jujutsu Kaisen is a "darkly enjoyable action series that's sure to be one to watch out for in 2020". Rebecca Silverman of Anime News Network ranked the first volume as a C. Silverman praised the series' use of Japanese folklore and yōkai elements, comparing this and Akutami's art style to Shigeru Mizuki's GeGeGe no Kitarō, but criticized the story for being "very generic". She concluded, "It has the potential to be more as Akutami gets more comfortable with the serialization process and figures out precisely where the story is going, so it may be worth a second book to be certain. But as of this one, it's just okay, making it the kind of series that gets damned with faint praise". Azusa Takahashi of Real Sound praised its storytelling, setting and "surprising" story development, also noting similarities to other works like Bleach, Ushio & Tora or Neon Genesis Evangelion, stating, however, that the series is not only a homage to popular works centered on the battle development, but that it has a "clever composition that sublimates into originality, so you have to be absorbed in it."

Anime
The Jujutsu Kaisen anime was awarded "Anime of the Year" at the 5th Crunchyroll Anime Awards, while Ryomen Sukuna won the "Best Antagonist" category and "Lost in Paradise feat. AKLO" by ALI won the "Best Ending Sequence" category. In January 2021, it was revealed that the anime series was the second most-watched anime series on Crunchyroll in 2020, only second to Black Clover, being watched in 71 countries and territories, including North America, South and Central America, Europe, Middle East and North Africa, Africa, Asia and Oceania. The official music video of the series' first opening, "Kaikai Kitan" by Eve, reached 100 million views on YouTube in April 2021, being one of the fastest anime openings to hit such number of views. In 2021, Jujutsu Kaisen ranked second in the anime category of the Yahoo! Japan Search Awards, based on the number of searches for a particular term compared to the year before. During the same year, the series became the second most discussed TV show worldwide on Twitter, surpassing Squid Game. It also won the Best TV Anime award at the 2021 Newtype Anime Awards, while Hiroshi Seko won Best Screenplay for his work on the series. In 2022, the series won the Tokyo Anime Award for Animation of the Year in the television category.

Critical reception
Micah Peters of The Ringer said that while the series' "focused execution" of shōnen tropes makes it "infinitely watchable", is its "specificity, its personality, its ultra-slick stylishness" what make the show special. He added: "Like with Park’s previous work, there is a sumptuous amount of splashy, expensive, mo-cap-enabled animation, delivering on the action promised by the comics". Paul Thomas Chapman of Otaku USA called it a "prime example of average material elevated by excellent execution", adding that it is similar to Bleach and YuYu Hakusho. Chapman commented that Sunghoo Park "puts the “beatdown” in narrative beats", being able to "segue from goofy comedy to chilling horror in an instant", and that he and the crew at MAPPA "make this narrative mutability seem effortless". Ana Diaz of Polygon highlighted the 17th episode, praising the series' treatment of its female characters, different to other shōnen series. Diaz wrote: "Jujutsu Kaisen goes a step further than avoiding gender tropes by presenting a variety of female perspectives. It’s not like there’s any right way for these young women to deal with the unique pressures they face. The story lets them disagree, and fight for their perspectives and their place". She concluded: "The show’s widespread success signals that audiences aren’t just ready for change, they’re actively craving it. Now, every other creator has the green light to write all kinds of women into their shows".

Awards and nominations

Novels
Jujutsu Kaisen: Iku Natsu to Kaeru Aki and Jujutsu Kaisen: Yoake no Ibara Michi were among the best-selling novel series in the first half of 2021 (period between November 2020 and May 2021), with 235,170 and 206,059 copies sold, respectively, and both novels were the best-selling-novel volumes in the first half of 2021. Both novels were the best-selling novels of 2021, collectively selling a total of 487,434 copies.

Notes
Explanatory

References

External links
  
  
  
 

Adventure anime and manga
Anime series based on manga
Animeism
Crunchyroll anime
Crunchyroll Anime Awards winners
Dark fantasy anime and manga
Exorcism in anime and manga
Ghost comics
Jump J-Books
Mainichi Broadcasting System original programming
MAPPA
Medialink
Shōnen manga
Shueisha franchises
Shueisha manga
Supernatural anime and manga
Toho Animation
TBS Television (Japan) original programming
Upcoming anime television series
Viz Media manga
Viz Media novels
Yōkai in anime and manga